Sycamore Row is a legal thriller novel by American author John Grisham published by Doubleday on October 22, 2013. The novel reached the top spot in the US best-seller list. It is preceded by A Time to Kill and followed by A Time for Mercy.

Plot

The title refers to a row of sycamore trees in the countryside near the fictional town of Clanton, in fictional Ford County, Mississippi. The trees play an important role in the book's plot, though the full significance becomes clear only in the end of the novel. It is suggested that these sycamores are very old, having been planted by Native Americans prior to the arrival of European settlers and their stolen, enslaved Africans in what would become the state of Mississippi.

The story begins three years after the sensational events in the trial of Carl Lee Hailey (A Time to Kill). An employee of wealthy recluse Seth Hubbard is instructed to meet his boss at a location by these sycamores one early Sunday afternoon. The employee finds Mr. Hubbard has hanged himself from the tree because his terminal lung cancer had become too painful. Accompanying the body are very specific funeral and burial instructions.

Jake Brigance, Carl Lee's former attorney, had gained much fame after the Hailey trial, as well as the respect of the black community and of many whites, but he has little to no money to show for it. During the Hailey trial, the Ku Klux Klan had tried to intimidate Jake by burning his home. Jake has yet to see any of the insurance money for the burnt house, which is tied up in litigation with his own insurance company. 

Jake receives a letter sent by Hubbard just before he killed himself, containing a new holographic will that renounces a will he filed the year before in which he leaves all his assets to his daughter and son as well as his grandchildren. In this new will, Hubbard stipulates that his children will receive nothing. Instead, five percent will be given to the local church and another five percent will be left to his long-disappeared brother, Ancil Hubbard. The remaining ninety percent is to be given to his black housekeeper Letitia "Lettie" Lang. Further instructions stipulate that the will must not be filed for probate until after Hubbard's funeral so that his children, who rarely visited him during his bout with cancer, can put on a show not knowing that they will ultimately be left with nothing.

Hubbard notes that his children will certainly contest the new will because they are greedy and that Jake must do whatever it takes to make sure the new will is enforced. He says he chose Jake because of the admirable work that Jake did during the Hailey trial.

Soon, Jake finds out that Hubbard had earned more than $20 million in a lumber yard business, a fortune unmatched by any other individual in Ford County. As the executor publishes this sum, the entire town of Clanton shifts their attention to the case.

Hubbard's children attempt to contest their father's new will by claiming he was not capable when filing it, igniting a hotly contested court battle with many twists and turns. Jake's first concern is to prevent the trial from becoming a race issue of blacks vs. whites. Since Ford County has a white majority, the jury would almost certainly also be majority white. On the other hand, whites in Ford County are far from completely biased, as proven by the fact that voters had elected a black sheriff to two consecutive terms by an overwhelming majority. Jake believes that if the race issue is toned down, the jury might rule for Lettie on the case's own merits, i.e. that Hubbard made his money himself and had the right to leave it to whoever he wanted and that he knew what he was doing when changing his will.

First, Jake must get rid of a rabble-rousing black lawyer from Memphis who goes to Clanton and involves himself in the case while engaging in a series of provocative acts which risk the chances of winning the case. Then, Lettie's husband, with whom she is on bad terms, kills two teens while driving drunk, arousing great passions against the Lang family and hurting their chance of a fair trial. As a measure of damage control, Jake convinces Lettie to immediately file for divorce (which was on her mind anyway).

The trial finally begins and goes well. Jake builds his case, and Lettie's own testimony makes a good impression on the jury and Jake succeeds in discrediting the testimonies of Hubbard's children and their assertion to have been close to their father and deeply caring during his illness. However, the opposing lawyer manages to spring a surprise witness, whose testimony seems to show that Lettie had tried to influence an earlier ailing employer to leave her money in a will, creating a suspicion of her systematically preying on the weakness of elderly ailing people. Still another surprise witness, a former black female employee with whom Hubbard had sexual relations comes forward, implying that Lettie had also slept with Hubbard.

The trial looks lost for Jake, with even the two black jurors starting to strongly doubt Lettie's credibility. At the last moment, the trial is changed again by a sensational deposition given by Hubbard's long-lost brother Ancil. Ancil, who had a very traumatic childhood, had left Ford County and joined the U.S. Navy at the age of 17, vowing never to return. Since then, he had led an adventurous and often criminal life around the world under a variety of assumed names, until finally being located as a bartender in Juneau, Alaska.

The disbarred Lucien, Jake's friend and ex-partner who is an alcoholic but when sober still a sharp legal mind, goes to Alaska and manages to obtain Ancil's testimony. Ancil explains why Seth left the money to his housekeeper and the significance of the sycamore tree from which he hung himself.

In the 1920s, Lettie's grandfather Sylvester, whom she never knew, owned a considerable plot of land. His being a landowner was very much a rarity for a black person in the segregationist Deep South, and was greatly resented by racist whites in general and in particular by his neighbor, Cleon Hubbard, who laid a claim to Sylvester's land. Hubbard, an abusive man who was often violent toward his wife and two sons, Seth and Ancil, tried to go to court. However, Sylvester had an unassailable title to the land, registered by the family during the Reconstruction period when federal troops, present in the South in the aftermath of the Civil War, upheld the rights of blacks.

Having failed in court, Hubbard resorted to the alternative method available at the time to whites in the Deep South, i.e. lynch law. Sylvester was falsely accused of "speaking rudely to white women", which, together with resentment at his being a black landowner, was enough to mobilize a lynch mob. Several men dragged Sylvester from his home and hanged him from a sycamore tree. His sons, Ancil and Seth, who did not share their father's prejudice and sometimes played with the black children, secretly observed this scene with great horror. Subsequently, Cleon Hubbard intimidated Esther, Lettie's grandmother, who had just seen her husband being murdered with impunity, and forced her to sign away the family's ownership for a pittance – with a promise that she could continue residing on the property. However, the promise was promptly broken, and Cleon and the sheriff then expelled the entire extended family and set fire to their homes and small chapel, totally eradicating the small black community which had been known as "Sycamore Row". Esther, along with her five-year-old daughter (who would become Lettie's mother), had to escape with virtually no possessions. An older child, with whom the Hubbard boys sometimes played, drowned in a river during the final expulsion.

Years later, Seth Hubbard used the property gained by his father as collateral for a mortgage in order to build his lumber yard. Knowing that his success was partly owed to this mortgage and wanting to make up for the injustice caused by his father, he decided to give the majority of his capital to Lettie and in a final act hung himself from the same tree from which Lettie's grandfather was hung.

After hearing Ancil Hubbard's testimony, the jury unanimously upholds the will and rejects the claims against its validity by Hubbard's children. However, an appeal seems very probable, which might last for years and consume a large part of the estate in legal fees. Moreover, the judge's decision to let the jury hear Ancil Hubbard's testimony might be challenged on procedural grounds (it was a recorded testimony and opposing counsel could not cross-examine him). Therefore, Judge Reuben Atlee suggests the parties settle the case with reasonable conditions. As the judge suggests, after Ancil Hubbard and the local church get their promised share, $5 million would be given to a fund providing college education to members of Lettie's family, all of whom share in the terrible legacy of the 1930 lynching and expulsion. Such a fund would also help Lettie get off her back numerous relatives who had shown up since the news spread that she would become rich. Jake would be in charge of this fund, giving him steady employment but also a lot of headaches. The remaining $6 million would be divided equally between Lettie and Seth Hubbard's children.

The compromise is acceptable to everybody. Lettie is content to get back the land which belonged to her grandfather and build on it a nice house for herself, her children and grandchildren and does not mind Seth Hubbard's children getting at least some of his money. In the final scene, Ancil Hubbard arrives from Alaska and has an emotional meeting with Lettie and other protagonists under the sycamore tree, she asking him to let the past lie and look to a better future.

Reception
According to USA Today, "Jake Brigance returns to the courtroom in a 'dramatic showdown as Ford County again confronts its tortured history.'"

References

2013 American novels
Novels by John Grisham
Legal thriller novels
American thriller novels
Doubleday (publisher) books
Lynching
Sequel novels
Novels set in Mississippi
Fiction set in 1988
Third-person narrative novels
Hodder & Stoughton books